Ricardo Rodríguez Suárez (born 3 April 1974), is a Spanish football coach. He was most recently the head coach of the J1 League club Urawa Red Diamonds. He was declared the best coach of the J1 League in the 2020–21 season, in which he conquered the Emperor's Cup. Also, he won the Japanese Supercup in 2022.

Education
Born in Oviedo, Asturias, Rodríguez was a Real Oviedo youth graduate, but a serious knee injury forced him to leave his footballing career. He has a bachelor's degree in Physical Activity and Sport Sciences from the University of A Coruña (1994–1998), and between 2000 and 2002 he obtained a PhD in Physical Activity and Sport Sciences at the University of Oviedo while studying a master's degree in Sports High Performance provided by the Spanish Olympic Committee at the same time.

From 2003 until 2006, Rodríguez completed the necessary studies to obtain the coaching badge from UEFA Pro License, provided by the Spanish Football Federation.

Managerial career
Rodríguez started his career in 1998 at his former club Oviedo, being named the reserves' coach. In 2001, he was promoted to the main squad in Segunda División.

In 2003 Rodríguez worked as a director and manager of Real Madrid's youth school in México City, along with Alberto Gil and Xabier Azkargorta. He remained in charge for three years.

Girona 

In 2006, Rodríguez returned to his home country, being appointed manager of Girona FC's Juvenil squad. On 6 February of the following year, he was named manager of the Catalans' first team in Tercera División (along with sporting director Javi Salamero), replacing fired Joan Carrillo, until the end of the campaign. He achieved promotion in the play-offs, after defeating Paco Jémez's RSD Alcalá.

Málaga 
On 25 June 2007 Rodríguez was named at the helm of Málaga CF's B-team, but was shortly after appointed as Juan Muñiz's assistant at the main squad and being promoted to La Liga at the end of the season. In July 2008 he was appointed as director of football.

On 4 March 2010 Rodríguez left the Andalusians, with the club already promoted.

Saudi Arabia 
In August 2011 he signed a three-year deal with the Saudi Arabia Football Federation, initially as a consultant.

Rodríguez acted along with Juan Ramón López Caro and Frank Rijkaard, being added in the latter's squad in August 2012. In January 2013, after Rijkaard's dismissal, López Caro was appointed manager of the full squad and Rodríguez took charge of the under-17s.

Return to Girona 
On 4 July 2013 Rodríguez returned to Girona, with his side now in Segunda División. He was relieved from his duties on 19 December, after a poor display in his last outings.

Thailand 
On 19 January 2014 Rodríguez was named at the helm of Thai Premier League's Ratchaburi F.C. Rodríguez finished his first season in Thailand with Ratchaburi by the fourth place in the final standing, highest position in the club history. In November, after the season's end, he left the club and signed for fellow league team Bangkok Glass F.C. shortly after. Rodríguez was sacked near the end of the 2015 season after 30 games of domestic league. In March 2016 he was appointed as manager of Suphanburi.

On 28 June 2016, Ricardo Rodriguez has resigned from his position at Suphanburi after 3 months in charge.

Tokushima Vortis 
In November 2016, Rodríguez signed with Japan's J2 League side Tokushima Vortis from 2017 season. Rodríguez is the first Spanish coach to win a trophy in Japan.

Urawa Red Diamonds 
After successfully having guided Vortis to the first-ever J2 title, it was announced he will join Urawa Red Diamonds for the 2021 season. At the end of his first season he was considered the most valued coach in the JLeague "for the impact on the club and the game changer of Urawa Reds" by recovering the competitive spirit of the team. At the end of the season, the was declared the best coach of the J1 League, and also he won the Emperor's Cup. Weeks later, Ricardo Rodríguez further strengthened his project at the helm of Urawa Red Diamonds by winning the Japanese Super Cup against the JLeague champions, Kawasaki Frontale, and became the first Spanish coach to win the Emperor's Cup and the Japanese Super Cup. At the end of the season 2022, Ricardo Rodríguez decided to call time on his successful tenure at Urawa Red Diamonds to embark on new professional challenges after leading the team to the AFC Champions League final and glory in the Emperor's Cup and the Japanese Super Cup.

Managerial statistics

Honors and awards

Club
Urawa Red Diamonds
Emperor's Cup: 2021
Japanese Super Cup: 2022

Individual
 J.League Manager of the Year: 2021

References

External links

Soccerway profile

1974 births
Living people
Sportspeople from Oviedo
University of Oviedo alumni
Spanish football managers
Segunda División managers
Girona FC managers
Ricardo Rodriguez
Ricardo Rodriguez
Ricardo Rodriguez
Ricardo Rodriguez
Tokushima Vortis managers
Urawa Red Diamonds managers
J1 League managers
J2 League managers
Spanish expatriate football managers
Expatriate football managers in Thailand